Business Ethics Quarterly is a peer-reviewed academic journal that publishes theoretical and empirical research relevant to all aspects of business ethics. It publishes articles and reviews on a broad range of topics, including the internal ethics of business organizations, the role of business organizations in larger social, political, and cultural frameworks, and the ethical quality of market-based societies and market-based relationships. Business Ethics Quarterly is the official journal of the Society for Business Ethics and is published on a non-profit basis by the Cambridge University Press. The editor-in-chief are Frank den Hond, (Hanken School of Economics) and Mollie Painter, (Nottingham Trent University).

Abstracting and indexing 
The journal is abstracted and indexed by:

 ABI/INFORM
 ATLA Religion Database
 Business ASAP
 Business Source
 Business & Corporate Resource Center
 Business Periodicals Index
 Corporate ResourceNet
 Dow Jones Insight
 Emerald Reviews
 Index Philosophicus
 International Bibliography of the Social Sciences
 MEDLINE
 PAIS International
 Philosopher's Index
 Philosophy Research Index
 PhilPapers
 ProQuest Social Science Journals
 Public Affairs Index
 Scopus
 Social Sciences Citation Index
 Wilson Business Abstracts

According to the Journal Citation Reports, the journal has a 2020 2-year impact factor of 3.719, ranking it 6th out of 54 journals in the category "Ethics" and 85th of 153 journals in the category "business".

See also 
 List of ethics journals

References

External links 
 
 Society for Business Ethics

Cambridge University Press academic journals
Business and management journals
Business ethics
English-language journals
Publications established in 1991
Quarterly journals
Ethics journals